Shawne Brian Williams (born February 16, 1986) is an American former professional basketball player. He played college basketball for the University of Memphis before being selected 17th overall in the 2006 NBA draft by the Indiana Pacers.

High school career
Considered a five-star recruit by Rivals.com, Williams was listed as the No. 5 shooting guard and the No. 15 player in the nation in 2005.

College career
In his freshman year of 2005–06 at Memphis, Williams averaged 13.2 points and 6.2 rebounds per game while also averaging 1.4 steals and blocks, playing in 36 games while starting 34. He led all Conference USA freshmen in scoring and rebounding. Williams averaged 18.0 points and 6.7 rebounds in three games in the Conference USA tournament, being named the tournament MVP. He can also play at the guard position.

Professional career

Indiana Pacers (2006–2008)
Williams signed with the Indiana Pacers July 6, 2006. Williams scored 13 points in his NBA debut against the Chicago Bulls on December 11, 2006.

Dallas Mavericks (2008–2010)
On October 10, 2008, Williams was traded to the Dallas Mavericks for Eddie Jones, two first-round draft picks and cash.

New York Knicks (2010–2011) 
On January 11, 2010, the Mavericks traded him and Kris Humphries to the New Jersey Nets for Eduardo Nájera. Four days later, the Nets waived Williams.

On September 23, 2010, the New York Knicks signed Williams to a one-year contract. Williams had his best season with New York, playing a key role off the bench for the team as the Knicks reached the 2011 NBA playoffs.

New Jersey Nets (2011–2012)
On December 15, 2011, the New Jersey Nets signed Williams to a two-year contract, beating the offer made by the New York Knicks.

Guangzhou Liu Sui (2013) 
On March 15, 2012, the Nets traded Williams, Mehmet Okur, and a 2012 first-round draft pick to the Portland Trail Blazers for veteran small forward Gerald Wallace. Williams never appeared in a game for Portland.

In early 2013, Williams joined Guangzhou Liu Sui for the 2013 NBL season.

Los Angeles Lakers / Los Angeles D-Fenders (2013–2014)
On September 3, 2013, Williams signed with the Los Angeles Lakers. He was waived on January 7, 2014, the deadline before his contract would become guaranteed. The Lakers had injuries to guards Kobe Bryant, Steve Nash, Steve Blake, Jordan Farmar, and Xavier Henry, and wanted to free up Williams' roster spot and salary in the event they later need another replacement at guard.

On January 27, 2014, Williams was acquired by the Los Angeles D-Fenders of the NBA D-League. On February 6, 2014, he re-signed with the Lakers to a 10-day contract. He did not sign a second 10-day contract with the Lakers after his first 10-day contract expired. On February 19, 2014, he was re-acquired by the D-Fenders.

Miami Heat (2014–2015)
On August 1, 2014, Williams signed with the Miami Heat, rejoining former Pacers teammate Danny Granger.

On February 19, 2015, Williams was traded to the New Orleans Pelicans in a three-team trade involving the Phoenix Suns. Three days later, he was waived by the Pelicans.

Detroit Pistons (2015)
On February 24, 2015, Williams was claimed off waivers by the Detroit Pistons.

On June 11, 2015, Williams was traded, along with Caron Butler, to the Milwaukee Bucks in exchange for Ersan İlyasova. However, he was later waived by the Bucks on June 30, 2015.

Iowa Wolves (2017–2018)
In October 2017, Williams joined the Iowa Wolves in the NBA G League.

Al-Riffa (2019)
On January 21, 2019, Williams was reported to have joined the Al-Riffa of the Bahraini Premier League.

Personal life 
On September 11, 2007, Williams was arrested in Indianapolis, Indiana on a charge of possession of marijuana. Two passengers in Williams' car were also arrested. One was charged with possession of marijuana, the other was charged with possession of a stolen handgun.

In January 2010, Williams was arrested in Memphis on felony drug charges for selling a codeine substance. Williams later pleaded guilty in April to misdemeanor drug possession. He was placed on six months' probation, ordered to undergo mandatory drug testing, attend a drug offender school and make a $10,000 contribution to the Shelby County Drug Treatment Court. His legal situation cleared up quickly.

During the summer of 2010, Williams received training camp invitations from two teams: the New York Knicks and Charlotte Bobcats. Williams' older brother, who was murdered, last saw him play at the Madison Square Garden. As a result of this sentimental connection, Williams chose to attend the Knicks' training camp.

On December 13, 2012, Williams was arrested again in Memphis on drug charges after a police officer smelled marijuana coming from a Porsche in a parking lot near a mall.  In the car, officers found a partially smoked joint of marijuana, as well as another joint and a bottle of codeine cough syrup that was not prescribed to Williams.

From 2011-2013 Williams dated Little Rock model Molly Mclane. As of 2017, Williams is engaged to rapper and Love & Hip Hop: Atlanta cast member Jessica Dime. They have a daughter born in 2018.

NBA career statistics

Regular season 

|-
| align="left" | 
| align="left" | Indiana
| 46 || 3 || 12.1 || .469 || .365 || .550 || 1.8 || .5 || .1 || .2 || 3.9
|-
| align="left" | 
| align="left" | Indiana
| 65 || 3 || 14.9|| .427 || .314 || .717 || 2.7 || .9 || .4 || .4 || 6.7
|-
| align="left" | 
| align="left" | Dallas
| 15 || 0 || 11.3 || .286 || .059 || .818 || 3.1 || .1 || .1 || .6 || 2.8
|-
| align="left" | 
| align="left" | New York
| 64 || 11 || 20.7 || .426 || .401 || .837 || 3.7 || .7 || .6 || .8 || 7.1
|-
| align="left" | 
| align="left" | New Jersey
| 25 || 6 || 20.6 || .286 || .241 || .727 || 2.7 || .6 || .4 || .4 || 4.5
|-
| align="left" | 
| align="left" | L.A. Lakers
| 36 || 13 || 20.9 || .380 || .326 || .700 || 4.6 || .8 || .5 || .8 || 5.6
|-
| align="left" | 
| align="left" | Miami
| 44 || 22 || 21.0 || .425 || .395 || .848 || 3.2 || .8 || .5 || .4 || 6.6
|-
| align="left" | 
| align="left" | Detroit
| 19 || 0 || 8.6 || .317 || .154 || 1.000 || 1.4 || .4 || .2 || .2 || 2.6
|-class="sortbottom"
| align="center" colspan="2" | Career
| 314 || 58 || 17.1 || .403 || .339 || .755 || 3.0 || .7 || .4 || .5 || 5.6

Playoffs 

|-
| align="left" | 2011
| align="left" | New York
| 4 || 0 || 25.3 || .417 || .429 || .750 || 3.5 || 1.3 || 1.0 || 1.0 || 8.0
|-class="sortbottom"
| align="center" colspan="2" | Career
| 4 || 0 || 25.3 || .417 || .429 || .750 || 3.5 || 1.3 || 1.0 || 1.0 || 8.0

References

External links

1986 births
Living people
African-American basketball players
American expatriate basketball people in China
American men's basketball players
Basketball players from Memphis, Tennessee
Big3 players
Dallas Mavericks players
Detroit Pistons players
Indiana Pacers draft picks
Indiana Pacers players
Iowa Wolves players
Los Angeles D-Fenders players
Los Angeles Lakers players
Memphis Tigers men's basketball players
Miami Heat players
New Jersey Nets players
New York Knicks players
Portland Trail Blazers players
Power forwards (basketball)
Small forwards
21st-century African-American sportspeople
20th-century African-American people
American men's 3x3 basketball players